In the Singapore Armed Forces (SAF), specialists are the group of ranks equivalent to non-commissioned officers in other armed forces. The term was introduced in 1993, for a more "positive" rank classification and shorter waiting time for Warrant Officers and Specialists (WOSPEC) career rank advancements. In the SAF, warrant officers are not considered specialists.

Like many other modern militaries, specialists form the backbone of the military. Specialists serve as the supervisor for the training and discipline of enlisted men and women, as well as the supervisor in the use of weapons and equipment, drill and ceremonies.

The following ranks are specialist ranks: 
 Specialist cadet (SCT)
 Third sergeant (3SG)
 Second sergeant (2SG)
 First sergeant (1SG)
 Staff sergeant (SSG)
 Master sergeant (MSG)

Senior specialists may be promoted to warrant officer ranks, through the Joint Warrant Officers Course at the SAFWOS Leadership School. Under the new scheme, they will need to first go through the rank of third warrant officer, which is usually attained just before or after they go through the warfighter course from the Specialist and Warrant Officer Advanced School.

With the SAFWOS Leadership School, Specialist and Warrant Officer Advanced School and Specialist Cadet School, Pasir Laba Camp, site of the former Singapore Armed Forces Training Institute (SAFTI) is the new home of the warrant officer and specialist corps of the SAF.

Singapore Civil Defence Force
Despite being a uniformed service under the Home Team umbrella organisation under the Ministry of Home Affairs as opposed to the Ministry of Defence as in the case of the SAF, the Singapore Civil Defence Force also trains specialist cadets known as fire & rescue specialists upon graduation from the Section Commander Course (SCC) administered by the Civil Defence Academy's Command & Staff Training Wing. On top of completing a firemanship course which makes specialists trained firefighters, fire and rescue specialists are also trained in a panoply of incident management (such as CBR and Hazmat mitigation), fire safety enforcement and fire investigation, and leads a team of fire fighters in fire fighting and rescue operations as section commanders, and eventually for some, as deputy rota commanders. Essentially, fire & rescue specialists form the backbone of the command operations of the Singapore Civil Defence Force particularly at the station level, filling the position of junior officers. Typically, all Singapore Civil Defence Force specialists (both reserves and regulars) graduate with the sergeant rank, while regulars may subsequently be promoted to the rank of staff sergeant. Senior staff sergeants may eventually be selected to undergo a warrant officer course and become a warrant officer in the force. 

Apart from that, there are also disaster and rescue team, hazardous materials (Hazmat) and paramedic specialists who are made up of regulars in the Singapore Civil Defence Force. 

The disaster and rescue team specialist is skilled in urban search and rescue, prolonged fire fighting operations, height and confined space operations, road traffic and industrial accidents and water rescue. On the other hand, the Hazmat specialist specialises in detection and containment of hazardous chemicals and toxins while the paramedic specialist is part of the emergency ambulance service team providing efficient and accurate pre-hospital care to accident victims and patients in critical condition.

See also
 Singapore Armed Forces ranks
 Comparative military ranks

References

External links
SAF Military Ranks
Specialist & Warrant Officer Institute

Military ranks of Singapore